Owa Owaluse was an Ijesha Oba (king) who ruled Ijeshaland from 1522 to 1526 and bore the title HRM Owa Obokun Adimula. He found Ilesa the current capital of Ijeshaland. He gave room for military supervision under the able leadership of Lemodu and Lejoka

References
 Prince Adeoye Agunlejika,(1996) The great feet in the sand of time : a biography of a great monarch Alayeluwa Oba Peter Adeniran Olatunji Agunlejika II : Owa Obokun Adimula of Ijesaland 1912-1981 Page 7

Nigerian noble families